The Florida State Fairgrounds is located in East Lake-Orient Park, Florida. In addition to holding the annual Florida State Fair, the fairgrounds also host a wide variety of other events throughout the year. The 2022 Florida State Fair took place February 10–21, 2022.

Cracker Country 

Cracker Country is a rural Florida living history museum located on the Florida State Fairgrounds. It was founded with the purpose of preserving Florida's rural heritage.  The museum recreates an 1890s rural Florida town. Its collection of 13 original buildings dating back from 1870 to 1912 were relocated from across the state of Florida beginning in 1978 when Cracker Country was established by Mr. and Mrs. Doyle E. Carlton, Jr. Today, the historically furnished buildings recreate the lifestyles of the past; and costumed interpreters portray daily living as Florida pioneers and share the stories of early Floridians’ experiences.

MidFlorida Credit Union Amphitheatre 

An outdoor venue, the MidFlorida Credit Union Amphitheater (previously known as Ford Amphitheater, 1-800-ASK-GARY Amphitheater, and Live Nation Amphitheater) hosts events throughout the year, including concerts featuring musical acts. The venue is open air with a large covering over most of the seats and the stage area, and has both reserved and lawn seating.

Bob Thomas Equestrian Center 

The Bob Thomas Equestrian Center is located at the Florida State Fairgrounds witch includes exercise grounds, warm-up rings, two show rings, and a grand prix ring. The area was created in the 1970s when the state fair was moved from its original downtown location. The Bob Thomas Equestrian Center features 471 permanent stalls in five barns plus ample parking for vehicles and trailers.

The newest addition to the equestrian center is a covered 314' by 165' arena. Guests and spectators can watch a variety of horse shows seating in shaded bleachers or on a grassy hill. The equestrian center holds year-round events from youth to Olympic qualifiers.

See also 
 Florida State Fair
 Expo Hall

References

External links 
 

Fairgrounds in the United States
Florida culture
Buildings and structures in Tampa, Florida
Economy of Tampa, Florida
Sports venues in Tampa, Florida
Tourist attractions in Tampa, Florida
Florida State Fair